The Rhode Island Rams women's basketball team is a college basketball program that competes in NCAA Division I and the Atlantic 10 Conference representing the University of Rhode Island.

History
Rhode Island began play in 1975. They have lost in the conference tournament final in 1984 and 2003. In their lone appearance in the NCAA Tournament 1996, they lost 90-82 to Oklahoma State. The 1996 team finished the season with a record of 21-8, which would stand as the program's best record until the 2022 team finished with a 22-7 record. Several players received Atlantic 10 conference honors from first team to third team, and Rookie of the Year.

Postseason

NCAA Tournament results

WNIT results

References

External links